The Heilsberg transmitter was a large radio transmitting station operated by the Reichs-Rundfunk-Gesellschaft between 1930 and 1945 in the German Province of East Prussia.

History

On 31 January 1945, the facility was destroyed by the largest part of the withdrawing Wehrmacht armed forces. After World War II a transmitter was operated on the site by the Soviet Foreign Service. From the mid 1950s until the mid 1990s a local program was broadcast there with low power. A shortwave facility for cross-border skywave jamming beamed towards the Soviet Union, Czechoslovakia and Bulgaria has existed in Lidzbark Warmiński. The jamming facility was shut off for good in late 1988.

External links

SkyscraperPage.com: Heilsberg Transmitter - Cage Antenna Support Towers, Lidzbark Warminski
SkyscraperPage.com: Heilsberg Transmitter - Radio Tower, Lidzbark Warminski
SkyscraperPage.com: Heilsberg Transmitter - Radio Mast, Lidzbark Warminski
RadioPolska: Niekomercyjny serwis poświęcony radiofonii i telewizji w Polsce
RadioPolska: Z archiwum wykazu - 153-1602 kHz (2)

Towers in Poland
Lidzbark County
Buildings and structures in Warmian-Masurian Voivodeship